Anna Tabacchi (born 27 July 1976) is an Italian former figure skater. She competed in the pairs event at the 1992 Winter Olympics.

References

External links
 

1976 births
Living people
Italian female pair skaters
Olympic figure skaters of Italy
Figure skaters at the 1992 Winter Olympics
Sportspeople from the Province of Belluno